Reflections is an album by saxophonist Stan Getz which was released on the Verve label in 1964.

Reception
The AllMusic review by Pemberton Roach stated "A highly underrated and oft-ignored album, Reflections should be re-evaluated and viewed not as an acceptance of crass commercialism, but as a daring and brilliant artist's attempt to find pure music by blurring the boundaries between jazz and pop".

Track listing
 "Moonlight in Vermont" (Karl Suessdorf, John Blackburn) – 2:25
 "If Ever I Would Leave You" (Frederick Loewe, Alan Jay Lerner) – 2:14
 "Love" (Ralph Blane, Hugh Martin) – 2:41
 "Reflections" (Lalo Schifrin) – 2:42
 "A Sleepin' Bee" (Harold Arlen, Truman Capote) – 2:41
 "Charade" (Henry Mancini, Johnny Mercer) – 2:39
 "Early Autumn" (Ralph Burns, Woody Herman, Johnny Mercer) – 4:01
 "Penthouse Serenade (When We're Alone)" (Val Burton, Will Jason) – 3:14
 "Spring Can Really Hang You Up the Most" (Tommy Wolf, Fran Landesman) – 3:57
 "Nitetime Street" (Lalo Schifrin, Seymour Shifrin) – 3:53
 "Blowin' in the Wind" (Bob Dylan) – 2:32
Recorded in New York City on October 21, 1963 (tracks 3–5 & 8), October 22, 1963 (tracks 6, 7, 9 & 10) and October 28, 1963 (tracks 1, 2 & 11).

Personnel 
Stan Getz – tenor saxophone
Gary Burton – vibraphone (tracks 3–10)
Kenny Burrell – guitar
George Duvivier – bass
Joe Hunt – drums
Unidentified brass, strings, percussion and choir
Claus Ogerman (tracks 1, 2 & 11), Lalo Schifrin (tracks 3–10) – arranger, conductor

References 

1964 albums
Albums arranged by Claus Ogerman
Albums arranged by Lalo Schifrin
Albums conducted by Claus Ogerman
Albums conducted by Lalo Schifrin
Albums produced by Creed Taylor
Stan Getz albums
Verve Records albums